The Best of Big Bang is the third greatest hits album by South Korean boy band Big Bang. The album was stated to release on November 23, 2011 but due to G-Dragon's scandal, it was postponed to December 14, 2011.

Background
The Japanese Best album includes all singles released in Japan and songs from the albums Big Bang and Big Bang 2. It also includes a Japanese version of the song "Haru Haru". The Asia Best 2 2006–2011 album includes hits of the group during 2006 until 2011. It is the second part of the greatest hits Asia Best 2006–2009. The album was released in three different formats: a 2CD+DVD edition with a T-shirt, a 2CD+DVD edition only and a regular edition with the Japanese Best disc only.

Chart performance
The album debuted at number 1 in Oricon's daily chart and number 2 in Weekly album chart with 30,043 copies sold.

Track listing

Charts

Sales and certifications

Release history

References

External links
Big Bang Official Site
Big Bang Japan Official Site

BigBang (South Korean band) albums
2011 greatest hits albums
Universal Records compilation albums
Dance-pop compilation albums